William Hurst (by 1484-1568), of Exeter, Devon, was an English merchant and Member of Parliament.

Hurst was a bailiff of the City of Exeter in 1512 and 1522.

He was Mayor of Exeter for six terms, first in 1523, taking over after the death of the incumbent John Simon and re-elected the following year. He then returned to the position in 1535, 1545, 1551 and 1561.

He was a Member (MP) of the Parliament of England for Exeter in 1539, 1542 and 1545.

In his will (of 1552), Hurst gave six tenement houses in the Parish of Alhallows on the Walls, and a further six tenements on St Mary Arches, for the use of poor people.

References

15th-century births
1568 deaths
Members of the Parliament of England (pre-1707) for Exeter
Mayors of Exeter
English MPs 1539–1540
English MPs 1542–1544
English MPs 1545–1547